Sterling Commerce was a software and services company providing Omni-Channel Commerce, B2B including EDI translation software and one of the first B2B Integration platforms and managed file transfer ("MFT") products such as Connect:Direct (originally named Network Data Mover). Sterling Commerce was headquartered near Columbus, Ohio in Dublin, OH.  SBC Communications acquired Sterling Commerce (see "Ownership" below), then SBC merged with AT&T (renamed as Sterling Commerce, an AT&T Company), who sold Sterling Commerce to IBM.  Sterling Commerce's Columbus, Ohio campus is now an IBM facility.

Previous acquisitions 
 In September, 2003, Sterling Commerce divests its Banking Systems Division to Thoma Cresse Equity Partners who in turn launch VectorSGI in the banking industry 
 In April, 2004, Sterling Commerce acquired TR2, a Boston Based Data Synchronization Software Company 
 In January, 2005, Sterling Commerce acquired Yantra a provider of Distributed Order Management and Warehouse Systems as part of its cross-channel supply chain execution application strategy.
 In May, 2006, Sterling Commerce acquired Nistevo, a provider of on-demand transportation management products as part of its cross-channel supply chain execution application strategy.
 In November, 2006, Sterling Commerce acquired Comergent, a provider of Advanced Web Selling for B2B and B2C platforms as part of its cross-channel supply chain execution application strategy.

Ownership 
Sterling Commerce evolved from a company called OrderNet which was one of the first EDI-based Value Added Network companies found by William Plumb which started around 1978 and was a division of Informatics.  William Plumb is often cited as one of the fathers of EDI.
 In June, 1985, Sterling Software, a public company chaired by Samuel E. Wyly, made a successful tender offer for Informatics and acquired the company. Sterling Software was about 10% of the size of Informatics.  Through the integration, the company sold off several divisions of Informatics but kept and invested in OrderNet, renaming it Sterling Commerce.
SBC Communications purchased Sterling Commerce in 2000. 
 With the merger of AT&T Corp. and SBC Communications in November 2005, Sterling Commerce became an AT&T company. 
 In May 2010 IBM acquired Sterling Commerce from AT&T.

References

External links
 Sterling Commerce is now part of IBM

IBM acquisitions
EDI software companies